The 1900–01 Purdue Boilermakers men's basketball team was the first season Purdue University fielded a basketball team. They played a multi-game schedule, and compiled an 11–0 record against Indiana colleges and high schools.  The team averaged 30.7 points a game, while holding their opponents to 10 points a game.  The team, citing their perfect record, claimed to be state champions. H. Wallace Reimann lead the team as captain and unofficially as coach. William C. Curd, Jr. acted as the team's business manager.

Roster

Games

References 
 Information about the roster, schedule, and results derived from Purdue University, The Debris (yearbook), 1901.
 "Purdue to Mark 50th Anniversary of First Basketball Season," Kokomo Tribune, February 2, 1951, p. 27.

Purdue Boilermakers men's basketball seasons
Purdue